The Moroccan dirham (sign: DH; code: MAD) is the official monetary currency of Morocco. It is issued by the Bank Al-Maghrib, the central bank of Morocco. One Moroccan dirham is subdivided into 100 santimat (singular: santim).

History
The word dirham derives from the Greek currency, the drachma. The Idrissid dirham, a silver coin, was minted in Morocco under the Idrisid dynasty from the 8th to 10th centuries.

Before the introduction of a modern coinage in 1882, Morocco issued copper coins denominated in falus, silver coins denominated in dirham, and gold coins denominated in benduqi. From 1882, the dirham became a subdivision of the Moroccan rial, with 500 Mazunas = 10 dirham = 1 rial.

When most of Morocco became a French protectorate in 1912 it switched to the Moroccan franc. The dirham was reintroduced on 16 October 1960. It replaced the franc as the major unit of currency but, until 1974, the franc continued to circulate, with 1 dirham = 100 francs. In 1974, the centime replaced the franc.

Coins
In 1960, silver 1 dirham coins were introduced. These were followed by nickel 1 dirham and silver 5 dirham coins in 1965. In 1974, with the introduction of the santim, a new coinage was introduced in denominations of 1, 5, 10, 20 and 50 santimat and the 1 and 5 dirham coins. The 1 santim coins were aluminium, the 5 up to 20 santimat were minted in brass, with the highest three denominations in cupro-nickel. New cupro-nickel 5 dirham coins were added in 1980 and changed to a bi-metal coin in 1987.  The bi-metal coins bear two year designations for the issue date—1987 in the Gregorian calendar and the 1407 in the Islamic calendar.

The 1 santim was only minted until 1987 when new designs were introduced, with a  dirham replacing the 50 santimat without changing the size or composition. The new 5 dirham coin was bimetallic, as was the 10 dirham coin introduced in 1995. Cupro-nickel 2 dirham coins were introduced in 2002. In 2012, a new series of coins has been issued, with the 5 and 10 dirham coin utilizing a latent image as a security feature.

Banknotes

The first notes denominated in dirham were overprints on earlier franc notes, in denominations of 50 dirhams (on 5,000 francs) and 100 dirhams (on 10,000 francs). In 1965, new notes were issued for 5, 10 and 50 dirhams. 100 dirham notes were introduced in 1970, followed by 200 dirham notes in 1991 and 20 dirham notes in 1996. 5 dirham notes were replaced by coins in 1980, with the same happening to 10 dirham notes in 1995. In mid-October 2009, Bank Al-Maghrib issued four million 50-dirham banknotes to commemorate the bank's 50th anniversary. The commemorative note measures 147 × 70 mm and features the portraits of Kings Mohammed VI, Hassan II, and Mohammed V. The back of the notes features the headquarters of Bank Al-Maghrib in Rabat. The speech delivered in 1959 by Mohammed V at the opening of Bank Al-Maghrib is microprinted on the back.

In December 2012, Bank Al-Maghrib issued a 25-dirham banknote to commemorate the 25th anniversary of banknote production at the Moroccan State Printing Works, Dar As-Sikkah. It is the first banknote in the world to be printed on Durasafe, a paper-polymer-paper composite substrate produced by Fortress Paper. The front of the commemorative note features an intaglio vignette and a watermark of King Mohammed VI, and a magenta-green color shift security thread. The thread, like the watermark, is embedded inside the banknote yet visible behind a one-sided Viewsafe polymer window. It also has a fully transparent polymer window embossed with the King's royal crest. The back of the note carries a print vignette commemorating 25 years of banknote printing at the Moroccan State Printing Works, Dar As-Sikkah. The windows in Durasafe are formed by die cutting each side of the three layer composite substrate separately. One-sided Viewsafe windows give a clear view inside the substrate where the thread and the watermark of King Mohammed VI are protected, but fully visible behind the polymer core. The transparent Thrusafe window is created by die-cutting both the outer paperlayers to reveal only the transparent polymer core.

On August 15, 2013, Bank Al-Maghrib has announced a new series of banknotes. The notes feature a portrait of King Mohammed VI and the royal crown. Each of the notes show a Moroccan door to the left of the portrait, demonstrating the richness of the country's architectural heritage, and symbolizing the openness of the country.

In 2019, Bank Al-Maghrib issued a 20-dirham banknote produced on polymer substrate to commemorate the 20th anniversary of the accession of Mohammed VI to the Moroccan throne.

Popular denominations and usage
Popular denominations are words widely used in Morocco to refer to different values of the currency; they are not considered official by the state. Those include the rial, equivalent to 5 santimat, and the franc , equivalent to 1 santim. Usually, when dealing with goods with a value lower than a dirham, it is common to use the rial or santim. For very high priced goods, such as cars, it is normal to refer to the price in santimat. However, rial is used when speaking in Arabic and centime when speaking in French.

Though not used by the young generation, the denomination 1,000, 2,000, up to 100,000 francs will be used by people who lived during the French colonial period when referring to 10, 20 and 1,000 dirham. Likewise, the rial is also used for higher value goods than portions of the dirham, reaching 5,000 dhs (100,000 rial). This denomination is used in a Moroccan Arabic speaking context.

The Moroccan dirham is also accepted in trade markets in Ceuta, despite the prices being displayed in euros.

See also
 Economy of Morocco
 United Arab Emirates dirham

Notes

References

External links

 

D
Currencies of Africa
Economic history of Morocco
Fixed exchange rate
1882 introductions
Currencies introduced in 1960
Currencies of Morocco